Pachytriton wuguanfui is a species of salamander in the family Salamandridae from Hunan and Guangxi in southern China.

References

wuguanfui